Abbott is a locality located in the Monte Partido of Buenos Aires Province in Argentina.

References

Populated places in Buenos Aires Province